Prusinowice may refer to the following places:
Prusinowice, Łęczyca County in Łódź Voivodeship (central Poland)
Prusinowice, Pabianice County in Łódź Voivodeship (central Poland)
Prusinowice, Zduńska Wola County in Łódź Voivodeship (central Poland)
Prusinowice, Świętokrzyskie Voivodeship (south-central Poland)
Prusinowice, Masovian Voivodeship (east-central Poland)
Prusinowice, Opole Voivodeship (south-west Poland)